Falster is an island in south-eastern Denmark with an area of  and 43,398 inhabitants as of 1 January 2010. Located in the Baltic sea, it is part of Region Zealand and is administered by Guldborgsund Municipality. Falster includes Denmark's southernmost point, Gedser Odde, near Gedser.

The largest town is Nykøbing Falster with over 40% of the island's inhabitants. Other towns include Stubbekøbing, Nørre Alslev and Gedser.

Falster has motor and railway links both to the larger island of Zealand to the north and to the island of Lolland to the south-west. These links also lead to the smaller islands of Masnedø and Farø. European route E47 links Copenhagen to Hamburg (Germany) via Falster.

History

From medieval times until 1766, most of Falster belonged to the crown. King Valdemar's Census Book from c. 1231 lists all the parishes and most of the villages. Falster's two main towns, Nykøbing and Stubbekøbing, were both founded towards the end of the 12th century.

In medieval times, the island was marked by wars with the Wends in 1158 and with Lübeck in 1253. The census of 1509 includes only 90 of the 110 villages mentioned earlier. By contrast, it mentions 29 new settlements mainly along the coast.

In the 16th century, Falster had a number of farms which were owned by the local nobility but, from 1560 to 1630, they were slowly returned to the crown which once again owned the entire island. Therefore, Falster could therefore be used as the dowry for Frederick III's wife, Sophie Amalie but as a result of the high taxes which resulted, many of the farms were deserted.

Falster was managed as a crown estate from 1718 until 1766 when it was sold by auction and divided up into ten large farms, five of which were given large new fields. But as the fields had to be prepared through the serfdom of local peasants, this led to many disputes.

The villages were replaced by the community from 1778 to 1814, and gradually moved to freehold tenants, a process which was only completed in about 1860.

Falster experienced significant economic expansion after 1880 when, with the establishment of cooperative dairies and slaughterhouses, farming was concentrated on livestock production and forage crops. There was also an increase in the cultivation of sugar beet which was processed in factories at Nykøbing and Stubbekøbing between 1890 and 1914. Many seasonal workers, especially women, from Sweden and Poland came to help with harvesting the sugar beet and some of them stayed.

With the new railway from Orehoved to Nykøbing in 1872 and railway ferries to Masnedø  (1884) and Warnemünde (1903), Falster slowly became a traffic hub. Its position was reinforced by the construction of the Storstrøm Bridge (1937) and Farø Bridges (1985).

Since 1975, Falster has been marked by high unemployment as a result of harder times for both farming and industry.

Towns and villages
, populations were as follows:

Tourism

With its marinas, sandy beaches and cycle tracks, Falster attracts tourists who wish to have relaxing holidays in unspoilt surroundings. One of the most popular resorts is Marielyst on the east coast.

Nykøbing offers a number of attractions including its old-town atmosphere with narrow streets. Of particular interest are the Middle Ages Centre, which is an open-air museum build as a part of a medieval town around year 1400 and the biggest attraction of the town. Among other attractions in Nykøbing are the Abbey Church (Klosterkirke) which was built in the 15th century, a City Museum and a zoo.

Scattered around the island are several minor museum such as Danish Tractor Museum and Crocodile Zoo in Eskilstrup, a motorbike and radio Museum in Stubbekøbing and a geological museum in Gedser, which holds the world's largest polished garnet by the name of "Nordstjernen" (the Northern Star).

Transport

Falster has a motorway and trunk roads linking its towns and villages.

Falster is connected to the larger island of Zealand to the north by the Farø Bridges (Farøbroerne) on European route E47 linking Copenhagen to Hamburg and the south. The Farø bridges join on the small island of Farø, and from there a further bridge gives access to the eastern neighbouring island of Møn. Falster is also connected to Zealand via the Storstrøm and Masnedsund bridges, via the island of Masnedø.

To the south-west, the E47 connects Falster to the island of Lolland via a tunnel under the Guldborgsund strait. There are two other bridges connecting to Lolland: the Guldborgsund Bridge at the northern end of the strait and the Frederick IX Bridge at Nykøbing Falster.

Nykøbing Falster's railway station is operated by Danish State Railways. There are regular passenger train services to Copenhagen via Ringsted. International trains operating between Copenhagen and Hamburg (via the train ferry between Rødby and Puttgarden) also call at the station. The company Lokaltog operates a rail service to Nakskov. The railway takes the Frederick IX bridge to Lolland and the Storstrøm and Masnedsund bridges to Zealand.

There are also frequent bus services linking Nykøbing with other towns and villages on the island as well as with destinations on Lolland, Møn and Zealand.

Cultural references
 Marie Grubbe, whose tragic life  has been the subject of several works of art including most notably Jens Peter Jacobsen's 1876 novel published in English as Marie Grubbe. A Lady of the Seventeenth Century in 1917, spent her last years in poverty on Falster.

Notable residents

People who were born, or have lived on Falster include:
 Marie Grubbe (1643–1718), noble woman, lived Stubbekøbing
 Hans Egede (1686 - 1758 in Stubbekøbing), Lutheran missionary
 Charles August Selby (1755–1823) English-Danish merchant and landowner, built the Orupgaard manor house near Idestrup
 Bernhard Severin Ingemann (1789 in Torkilstrup – 1862), novelist and poet
 Otto Valdemar Koch (1852 in Sønder Kirkeby – 1902) architect and local politician
 Sophus Torup (1861 in Nykøbing, Falster – 1937) physiologist who settled in Norway
 Evald Nielsen (1879 in Stubbekøbing – 1958) silversmith
 Rasmus Sigvardt (1886 in Orehoved - ??) a mechanic, he opened a cycle repair shop which later developed into an engine factory
 Peter Freuchen (1886 in Nykøbing Falster - 1957), Arctic explorer, author, and anthropologist
 Peter Laurits Jensen (1886-1961) engineer, inventor, entrepreneur and invented the first loudspeaker
 Jørgen Hare (1923 in Eskilstrup – 2007) sports shooter, competed at the 1952 Summer Olympics
 Connie Kruckow (born 1953) nurse who headed The Danish Nurses' Organization
 Frederik Magle (born 1977 in Stubbekøbing), composer, organist and pianist
 Mads Rasmussen (born 1981 in Idestrup), rower

Gallery

See also 

 List of islands of Denmark
 Lolland
 Langeland
 Zealand

References

External links

 Map of Lolland and Falster

 
Islands of Denmark
Geography of Guldborgsund Municipality
Danish islands in the Baltic